Piscataway Park, located  southwest of downtown Washington, D.C., in and around Accokeek, Maryland, protects Marshall Hall, the National Colonial Farm, and the Accokeek Creek Site. The park is located across the Potomac River from George Washington's Mount Vernon estate.

Piscataway Park is named after Piscataway Creek, itself named for a Native American tribe. The park is home to bald eagles, beavers, osprey, and other wildlife and encompasses areas of wetland, meadow and woodland.  It is administered by the National Park Service and is managed by National Capital Parks-East.

History
It includes the area of Moyaone, a Native American Piscataway village last occupied in 1623. The Fergusons bought more property and encouraged friends to settle nearby, where they could protect the environment. After Alice's death in 1951, Ferguson created the Alice Ferguson Foundation, which administered the land. The foundation made arrangements to donate property to the National Park Service for parkland, a transaction completed in the 1960s. This both protected the environment, as well as the historic viewshed as seen from the Mount Vernon mansion, keeping the parkland as it was in George Washington's day, and preventing modern development along the shore of the river.

References

External links

, including photo, at Maryland Historical Trust website
 National Park Service Piscataway Park official website
 "Piscataway Park" – Chesapeake Bay Gateways Network

Accokeek, Maryland
Museums in Prince George's County, Maryland
Parks on the National Register of Historic Places in Maryland
Parks in Prince George's County, Maryland
National Park Service areas in Maryland
National Capital Parks-East
Piscataway tribe
National Register of Historic Places in Prince George's County, Maryland
1961 establishments in Maryland